Cities of the Sun is an accessory for the 2nd edition of the Advanced Dungeons & Dragons fantasy role-playing game, published in 1995.

Contents
Cities of the Sun details the Khinasi people, who make their home on the south-eastern portion of the Cerilian continent. They band together in cities, and leave the outlying plains and savannah sparsely settled. The domains of the Khinasi are called states rather than kingdoms, and noble blood is not considered a requisite for power. All of the people are considered to be free and equal, although some have more money and influence than others, and a character's manners, hospitality, and also valued. Magic is unusually common in Khinasi lands, and practitioners of magic are well respected, and there is a high proportion of awnsheghlien as well.

The set describes the many states and provinces in detail, along with their relations to each other and the more important non-player characters. The set also provides new War Cards to represent the Khinasi military in the combat situations, including naval units.

New rules are provide to govern trade and warfare at sea as the Khinasi are a seafaring people. Cities of the Sun gives the means to create weather conditions, move shipping and deal with shipwrecks, along with the details of various vessels, their costs and upkeep. The trade rules are an extension to the simple rules provided with the Birthright Campaign Setting booklet, while the rules for comabt are similar to those for land-based encounters. The rules take missile and magical attacks into account, as well as boarding maneuvers. The combat rules are summarized on the large-scale color naval battle mat supplied for use with the ship cards, while its reverse acts as a map for the entire Khinasi region. Reference cards contain information and rules pertinent to other aspects of the region.

Cities of the Sun also includes a short adventure for 4 to 8 characters of levels 3–5. The player characters become embroiled in a conspiracy involving one of the awnsheghlien and a ruthless noble.

Cities of the Sun outlines states for player characters to govern, explore, and conquer. This book covers the Khinasi states, a region inspired by the Moorish culture of Spain.

Publication history
Cities of the Sun was written by Rich Baker, and was published by TSR in 1995.  The cover and conceptual art was by Tony Szczudlo, with interior art by John Dollar and Les Dorscheid, and war card art by Doug Chaffee.

Reception
Cliff Ramshaw reviewed Cities of the Sun for British magazine Arcane, rating it a 6 out of 10 overall. He felt that the set adds "some Arabian spice" to the "pseudo-European mediaeval feudalism permeating most of Cerilia". He felt that the additions to the combat rules add up to "a simple yet robust system that should enable referees to resolve sea battles with speed and excitement". Ramshaw found the adventure included in the set to be "a highly linear affair", and elaborates his feelings about the adventure: "Besides lacking in imagination and freedom of movement, the adventure is crippled by situations where intelligent or merely wild character play will scupper the plot. To prevent this, the referee is forced into taking drastic measures. For instance, the bad guys arrive with sufficient force to overcome the players' naval expedition, whatever their precautions and backup. Worse, one chance for testing the naval combat rules will be missed [...] unless a character sits around doing nothing while everyone else goes exploring. Saldy, the adventure lets down an otherwise solid product."

Reviews
Dragon #233

References

Birthright (campaign setting) supplements
Role-playing game supplements introduced in 1995